These are the top 25 albums of 2008  in Australia from the Australian Recording Industry Association (ARIA) End of Year Albums Chart.

Peak chart positions for 2008 are from the ARIA Charts, overall position on the End of Year Chart is calculated by ARIA based on the number of weeks and position that the records reach within the Top 100 albums for each week during 2008.

Notes

References 

Australian record charts
2008 in Australian music
Australia top 25 albums